is a passenger railway station in the city of Kimitsu, Chiba Prefecture, Japan, operated by the East Japan Railway Company (JR East).

Lines

Station layout
The station consists of an island platform and a side platform serving three tracks, connected to the station building by a footbridge. The station has a "Midori no Madoguchi" ticket counter.

Platforms

History
On May 24, 1919, the line was renamed the Hōjō Line, on April 15, 1929, it became the Bōsō Line, and on April 1, 1933, it became the Bōsōnishi Line. It became part of the Japanese National Railways (JNR) after World War II. The station was renamed to Kimitsu Station on April 1, 1956, and the line was renamed the Uchibō Line from July 15, 1972. Kimitsu Station was absorbed into the JR East network upon the privatization of JNR on April 1, 1987.

Passenger statistics
In fiscal 2019, the station was used by an average of 8003 passengers daily (boarding passengers only).

Surrounding area
 Kimitsu City Hall

See also
 List of railway stations in Japan

References

External links

 JR East Station information  

Railway stations in Chiba Prefecture
Railway stations in Japan opened in 1915
Uchibō Line
Kimitsu